Public Enemy Number Two is a novel written by Anthony Horowitz, the second in The Diamond Brothers series. It was first published in 1987. The main character in the book is Nick Diamond, His older brother Herbert Simple – who goes by the name Tim Diamond – is an unsuccessful private detective. The novel is particularly known for its humour. It is followed by South By South East.

Characters
Throughout the novel, there are many characters based on classical cliches in fiction.

Primary characters
Nicholas (Nick) Simple, the main character in the story (aged 13)
Herbert Simple aka Tim Diamond, Nick's older brother who works as a private detective
Peregrine Palis, Nick's new French teacher who is eventually revealed to be criminal mastermind known as "The Fence"
Johnny Powers, England's most notorious teenage criminal (aged 15)

Secondary characters
Chief Inspector Snape of New Scotland Yard, who has enlisted the help of Nick on several occasions to catch wanted criminals
Boyle, Inspector Snape's deputy
Ma Powers, Johnny's mother
Nails Nathan, Johnny's unhelpful sidekick

Protagonists
Nick Simple
Herbert Simple
Chief Inspector Snape
Boyle

Antagonists
Johnny Powers
Nails Nathan
Ma Powers
Big Ed
Big Ed's gang
Johnny Powers' gang
The Fence (Palis, Nick's French teacher)

Plot

	
After being kept behind in detention by his unpleasant French teacher, Mr Palis, Nicholas Simple (also known as "Nick Diamond") is visited by Chief Inspector Snape of Scotland Yard and his assistant, Boyle. They ask Nick if he would like to go to Strangeday Hall, an institution for criminals aged under 18, and befriend inmate Johnny Powers, a gang leader known as "Public Enemy Number One" following his recent conviction and 15-year prison sentence for armed robbery. They want Nick to find out the true identity of an unknown master criminal who controls all the buying and selling of stolen goods in London, known only as "the Fence". Nick refuses their offer and the police leave.
	
Soon afterwards, Nick visits Woburn Abbey on a school trip, but is framed for attempting to steal the Woburn Carbuncles, and despite his attempts to evade police, is arrested and sentenced to 18 months at Strangeday Hall. He has to share a cell with Johnny Powers - just as Snape and Boyle wanted, and no doubt arranged, to happen. Soon after he arrives, Snape and Boyle visit Nick and reveal that they arranged to have Nick framed. Nick manages to gain Johnny's trust after he saves Johnny from being killed by three followers of a notorious London gangster known as Big Ed.

Nick and Johnny soon escape Strangeday Hall with the help of Tim Diamond, Nick's brother (an unsuccessful private detective), and Ma Powers, Johnny's mother. They are pursued by the police but manage to escape. However, during the chase, Snape and Boyle appear and their car crashes and explodes, leaving Nick convinced that they are both dead and that he's the only person alive who knows he's innocent. Nick and Tim stay at Johnny's hideout in Wapping for a while, until Nick overhears Johnny telling Ma that he is going to see "Penelope". Believing Penelope to be the Fence, Nick follows Johnny into the Wapping tube station but loses him there. After making his way out onto the street, he is then captured by henchmen of Big Ed, who later tie him to a train track, intending for him to be killed by a train.

Nick is rescued by a man who cuts him free from the tracks just before the train passes. Nick knows that he had seen that man before, but doesn't know where, and the man has quickly disappeared. To prove his loyalty to Johnny, and take revenge on Ed, Nick burns the railway carriage which is their hide-out, by emptying an oil drum and starting a fire. Nick decides that he must go back to Johnny and Tim, but he is still determined to find the Fence, in the hope of being able to barter his freedom. Nick realises that Palis, his French teacher, could have seen Snape and Boyle on the afternoon that he was serving a detention. He heads for Palis's flat in Chelsea but is nearly caught by the police there; they had spotted him in a nearby street. Palis saves him, and Nick explains his mission to him. He stays the night at Palis's flat. Palis drives Nick back to Wapping the following morning and tells him to get in touch if he needs anything. At the hideout, Nick sees a doorbell. Not recalling one, he enters the house through the back and rescues Tim from a bomb rigged to go off if the newly installed bell had been rung.

Tim then explains that Johnny had come back the previous afternoon from wherever he had been to find Nick gone. They hadn't liked his answers, and during the night Johnny dragged Tim out of bed and tied him up before rigging the bomb. Nick and Tim discover that "Penelope" is actually a boat, and decide to keep a watch on the Penelope from a nearby derelict house. After seeing men storing objects aboard the Penelope, Nick remembers that Johnny went to "Penelope" through Wapping Tube Station. Nick and Tim go there and discover a secret entrance to a tunnel, which Johnny lost Nick through. The tunnel leads under the River Thames to the Fence's hideout where the brothers see many valuable stolen articles.

They then encounter Nails Nathan, and Johnny appears on the scene, aware that Nick is working for the police. He ties them up and locks them in a room, but they soon escape. Nick has brought the bomb with him in his backpack, and uses it to destroy the door to the room they are locked in. On their way out, Johnny re-appears and is ready to shoot Nick and Tim, but they are stopped by Snape and a group of armed policemen, who have been tracking Nick through the tracking device in his prison shoes since he escaped. Snape, who survived the crash uninjured (and had also rescued Nick when he was tied to the railway track), is intent on arresting Powers and his gang, but the roof of the underground den collapses. Ultimately, Nick and Tim survive, Ma Powers is arrested, but Johnny and Nails Nathan escape, while the Fence is still nowhere to be seen and there is still no clue to his or her true identity, although the Fence's operation is destroyed. Nick is subsequently cleared of all charges.
	
After Nick returns to school, he is sitting in a French lesson when Palis instructs Nick to translate a French paragraph. While doing so, Nick realises from the message he reads that Palis is the Fence, and that Palis had told Johnny Powers that he had been working for the police. At the end of the lesson, Palis announces to the class that he is leaving the school. He dismisses the whole class except Nick, who realises that Palis wants to kill him. Palis chases Nick to the school's roof with a gun, but wastes all his bullets trying to kill him. Palis attempts to plough into Nick, but falls over the  side of the building, and dies when he impales himself on a fence. With Palis dead, the story ends with Nick's troubles over.

References

The Diamond Brothers
1987 British novels
1987 children's books
Novels by Anthony Horowitz
British children's novels
Walker Books books